Andrea Marcato (born 17 April 1983) is an Italian rugby union coach and former international player. He won 16 caps for Italy and played in the 2008 and 2009 Six Nations Championships. After the end of his playing career he began coaching and is the head coach of Petrarca Rugby, a position he has held since 2017.

Mainly a fly-half, Marcato also used to play fullback.

As a player Marcato won 4 Italian championships with Benetton Treviso and also appeared for them in the Celtic League and the Heineken Cup; in 2011 he came back to Italy to newly promoted Calvisano, with which he won the 2011-12 title, his 5th personal Scudetto and 3rd for the club.

Youth 
Born in Padua, Andrea Marcato grew up in the small borough of Selvazzano, near Padua, where he started playing rugby at the age of eight encouraged by his father and his uncle who were former rugby union player themselves and coached the team; at 15 he entered the Petrarca Rugby youth academy, and at 19 he won the U-21 Italian Championship.

Playing career
Marcato debuted in Super 10 (then first tier of Italy's rugby championships) in 2002 and went on playing for Petrarca until 2005, when he left because of problems with the club's French coach Sauton.  He then signed a contract with Benetton Treviso where he won the Italian Championship at the first attempt.

After his first national title the National team's head coach Pierre Berbizier called Marcato in the squad and made his debut against Japan in July 2006: Marcato scored 2 penalties in his test debut.  That, apart from another test match against Portugal later in October, was the only match Marcato played for the next one and half years.

Marcato had a comeback in 2008 when the new head coach Nick Mallett included him in the squad for the Six Nations; in the last match of the tournament against Scotland Marcato scored a drop goal that gave Italy the win 23-20 and prevented the squad from recording a Whitewash.
Later in June in Córdoba, Argentina, he converted a late try that allowed Italy to get past the Pumas 13–12.
He also took part to the 2009 Six Nations where he played his 16th and last International match, against France at the Stadio Flaminio in Rome.

Marcato went on playing club rugby for Benetton Treviso until 2010, then returned to Petrarca; in early 2011 he was loaned back to Benetton as replacement in Celtic League; at the end of the 2010–11 season he came back to the Italian championship and signed with Calvisano which had just been promoted to the Eccellenza (the first tier championship).

Marcato helped Calvisano to become the first Italian club to win the top tier a year after winning promotion from the second division (2012); having won previously 4 titles with Benetton Treviso, the latter was his 5th personal Scudetto.

In 2013 he returned to the club of his birthplace, Petrarca Padua, where he ended his career as a player in 2017.

Coaching
In 2018, at the age of 34, he became Petrarca's youngest head coach since 1984, and in his first season as head coach led Petrarca to its 13th Italian title, the first for the club since 2011, and established himself as the youngest coach ever to win the Italian championship in the play-offs era (1987-88 onward) and the second youngest overall. In 2022 Marcato led the club to the Italian Cup and, later, its 14th Italian title.

Honours

Player 
 Benetton Treviso
 2005–06, 2006–07, 2008–09, 2009-10 Super 10 (Italian Premiership)
 2009-10 Italian Cup
 2006, 2009 Italian Supercup
 Calvisano
 2011-12 Eccellenza (Italian Premiership)
 2001-12 Italian Cup

Coach 
 Petrarca
 2017-18, 2021-22 Italian Premiership
 2021-22 Italian Cup

References

External links
 RBS 6 Nations profile
 

Italian rugby union players
Italian rugby union coaches
Italy international rugby union players
Benetton Rugby players
Rugby Calvisano players
Petrarca Rugby players
University of Padua alumni
Sportspeople from Padua
Living people
1983 births